Lepturopsis is a genus of beetles in the family Cerambycidae, containing the following species:

 Lepturopsis biforis (Newman, 1841)
 Lepturopsis dolorosa (LeConte, 1861)

References

Lepturinae